Ankara Esenboğa Airport  is the international airport of Ankara, the capital city of Turkey. It has been operating since 1955. In 2017, the airport has served more than 15 million passengers in total, 13 million of which were domestic passengers. It ranked 4th in terms of total passenger traffic (after Atatürk Airport, Antalya Airport and Sabiha Gökçen Airport), 3rd in terms of domestic passenger traffic (after Atatürk Airport and Sabiha Gökçen Airport) among airports in Turkey.

Overview
The airport is located northeast of Ankara,  from the city center. The airport is connected with Kızılay (the city center) and Ankara Intercity Bus Terminal (Turkish: Ankara Şehirlerarası Terminal İşletmesi, AŞTİ) by EGO city bus number 442 (from 6 am to 11pm). Transportation to the city center is also by taxi (around TRY 90 one way, metered) and through the Havaş bus line (approximately TRY 12,5 one way). The road between Esenboğa airport and the Ankara ring road was expanded during the summer of 2006, decreasing the driving time between the city center and the airport by several minutes.

The name of the airport comes from the village of Esenboğa (the ğ is silent), which literally means "Windflowing Bull" or "Serene Bull", the modernized form of Isen Buqa, the name of a Turkic warlord in the army of Timur who settled his troops here during the Battle of Ankara in 1402.

Esenboğa International Airport was awarded as the best airport in Europe by ACI Europe (Airport Council International) and the award presented to airport officials on 17 June 2009 in Manchester. The award is given in 4 categories every year and Esenboğa was in 5–10 million per annum category. It is the first time an ACI award was granted to a Turkish Airport. According to ACI-Europe, "As with number of the top candidates in this category, the airport excels in all the keys areas of operations, however the judges singled it out for its work in the area of environmental innovation, securing an incredible 25% energy savings stemming from its recycling of exhaust gases to power its air conditioning plants." In 2020, Esenboğa Airport was awarded as the best European airport with a capacity of 15 – 25 million passengers by Airports Council International.

A new parallel runway is under construction to the east of the terminal building. Upon the completion, the current runway 03R/21L will be resigned as 03C/21C and the new runway will receive the latter's former designation.

Terminals
Esenboga Airport Domestic and International Terminal constructed under "Build-Operate-Transfer" model has been completed within a record time; a year earlier than the committed completion date. Esenboga Airport Domestic and International Terminal, which went into operation on October 16, 2006 with a capacity of 10 million passengers, are spread over a 182 thousand m2 area. A new general aviation terminal with  area has been opened in January 2012 to service private and business jets.

The New Domestic and International Terminals, opened in 2006, feature  area, 10,000,000 passenger/year capacity, 18 ea. passenger bridges, 105 check-in counters, 34 passport counters, a parking facility with  area and 4,000 vehicles capacity.

Airlines and destinations

The following airlines operate regular scheduled and charter flights at Ankara Esenboğa Airport:

Statistics

Passengers

Movements

Other facilities
 The airport has the head office of AnadoluJet.
 Esenboğa Airport was designated as one of the emergency landing sites for NASA's Space Shuttle.

Aviation accidents and incidents at or near the airport
Scandinavian Airlines System Flight 871
Turkish Airlines Flight 835
1964 Turkish Airlines Ankara crash
1979 Turkish Airlines Ankara crash
Ankara Esenboğa Airport attack
Turkish Airlines Flight 158

Other airports in Ankara
There are three military airports in Ankara as follows:
 Akıncı Air Base
 Etimesgut Air Base
 Güvercinlik Army Air Base

References

External links 

 
 
 
 

1955 establishments in Turkey
Airports in Turkey
Buildings and structures in Ankara
Transport in Ankara Province
Space Shuttle Emergency Landing Sites
Airports established in 1955